Cassinia is the journal of the Delaware Valley Ornithological Club (DVOC). The journal is composed of papers relating to the ornithology of eastern Pennsylvania, New Jersey, and Delaware. Seventy three issues have been published to date. Five initial volumes (1890–1900) were published under the name Abstract of the Proceedings of the Delaware Valley Ornithological Club, and then in 1901 the journal was renamed in honor of ornithologist John Cassin.

Editorial History 
There have been 22 different editors of Cassinia since its inception:
 Witmer Stone — Vols. 1–14, 1890–1910
 Robert T. Moore — Vols. 15–19, 1911–1915
 Spencer Trotter — Vols. 20–24, 1916–1921
 Wharton Huber — Vol. 25: 1922, 1924
 Philip A. Livingston — Vols. 26–27, 1925–1928; and Vol. 31, 1938–1941
 J. Fletcher Street — Vols. 28–29, 1929–1932
 C. Brooke Worth / Witmer Stone — Vol. 30, 1933–1937
 Ernest A. Choate — Vols. 32–37, 1942–1948
 C. Chandler Ross — Vols. 38–42, 1949–1954
 Lester S. Thomas — Vols. 43–45, 1958–1960
 James K. Meritt — Vols. 46–49, 1961–1966; and Vols. 51–55, 1968–1975
 Albert Conway — Vol. 50, 1966–1967
 Keith C. Richards — Vol. 56, 1976
 Richard C. Bell — Vols. 57–59, 1977–1981
 Edward D. Fingerhood — Vols. 60–62, 1982–1987
 Franklin C. Haas — Vols. 63–66, 1988–1995
 Sandra L. Sherman — Vols. 67–68, 1996–1999
 Colin Campbell — Vol. 69, 2000–2001
 F. Arthur McMorris — Vols. 70–71, 2002–2005
 Dave B. Long — Vols. 72/73–74/75, 2006–2015
 Matthew R. Halley — Vols. 76–77, 2016–2019
Holger Pflicke — current

External links
Cassinia Web site
DVOC Web site

References 

Journals and magazines relating to birding and ornithology
Academic journals published in the United States